Sognaayili is a community in Sagnarigu District in the Northern Region of Ghana. It is a less populated community with nucleated settlements. A large portion of men in the community are farmers while rest work with livestock and poultry production.

See also
Suburbs of Tamale (Ghana) metropolis

References

External links 

Communities in Ghana
Suburbs of Tamale, Ghana